is the twenty-third entry of the long-running Japanese Super Sentai metaseries. Its footage was used in the American television series, Power Rangers Lightspeed Rescue. It aired from February 21, 1999 to February 6, 2000, Seijuu Sentai Gingaman and was replaced by Mirai Sentai Timeranger.

It was announced by Shout! Factory on January 9, 2018, that GoGoFive was to be released with English subtitles on DVD in North America. It was released on April 24, 2018. This is the 8th Super Sentai Series to be released on Region 1 DVD in North America. In August 2018, Shout! streamed the series on their website.

Synopsis
Grandiene has been waiting for the moment she can manifest on Earth on the day when the planets are in the alignment of the Grand Cross, sending her children to make the preparations while making Earth into a realm of darkness for her. But Professor Mondo Tatsumi of the Tatsumi Disaster Prevention Research Center, while failing to convince his peers of this event despite his eminence, left his family to secretly develop the Rescue System to counter the threat by the Psyma Family. When the Psyma commence their attack in 1999, months before the Grand Cross is to occur, the Tatsumi siblings find themselves recruited by their estranged father to fight the demons as the GoGoFive team.

Characters

GoGoFive
 is from a long line of "machi-bikeshi" (firefighters of Edo, the capital of the Tokugawa Shogunate) and they are portrayed as providing emergency and rescue services in Tokyo.

He belongs to the  Special Rescue Brigade. He is 24 years old and takes his duties as a leader and as the eldest brother very seriously. He never backs down from a fight, regardless of how difficult it might be, and sometimes berates his younger siblings when they make mistakes. Matoi does everything "by the book", and rarely makes mistakes. He feels very responsible for his younger brother and sister, as he played a large role in raising them; whilst he is their brother, he also serves as a father figure. He often gets into arguments with Shou. He often argues with his siblings, but mainly out of concern for them and a desire for them to succeed. He was responsible for devising the team's battle cry. His name comes from the word "matoi", an ancient object used by firemen during the Edo period Japan to warn people of a fire nearby.
He belongs to the Capital City Fire Dept. Chemical Fire Fighting Brigade. Nagare spends much of his time looking out for his younger brother, Daimon, though Daimon often ignores his older brother's advice, a trait that often lands him in trouble. Nagare was once suspended because of an injury sustained by Daimon in a fight, despite the fact that he had advised Daimon against becoming involved in the confrontation. Since their youth, they have had a fractious relationship, with Daimon's wayward behavior often getting Nagare into trouble. Nagare rarely responds to his older brother's chastising. Nagare is very protective of his family and would sacrifice himself to save the Tatsumi family and the team. He is usually the most serious and intellectual member of the group; Nagare does not rush into a fight without knowing who he is facing. As a chemist, he developed the fire-fighting equipment in his department, as well as the human-sized robot Big Douser. He is 23 years old.
He is a helicopter pilot in the Capital City Fire Dept. Helicopter Brigade. He had always dreamed of being a pilot, and when he first got his job, the whole family celebrated with him, with Matoi even singing karaoke. He then ran out of the room to thank God for granting his wish. Once, after an argument with Matoi relating to his desire to be a pilot outweighing his desire to be a GoGoFive team member, Shou came close to leaving the team. Out of all of the siblings, Shou is the angriest and most bitter towards their father. While Nagare does not talk back to their older brother, Shou does, and he constantly argues with Matoi. Shou is a skilled helicopter pilot; he never loses control and is very reliable. Because of this good record, it was a shock to both himself and the team, when during one mission his reckless flying nearly cost the lives of civilians, with an intense argument between Shou and his older brother ensuing. Shou is a cunning and swift warrior, though at times he questions his older brother's leadership. He is 22 years old.
Daimon is a  police officer. He is the hothead of the group, and he often rushes into situations before thinking, which can get him into trouble. Angry at his brother Nagare's suspension for something that was not his fault, Daimon sticks up for him. He is somewhat the joker of the team; being the youngest male he can be reckless and cocky. Daimon struggles with the concept of being a team player – one of the reasons he is one of the most common recipients of Matoi's chastisement is because he thinks he can handle any situation on his own without his siblings' help. When the team works together they are far more capable and powerful than when working individually; a lesson that Daimon learns the hard way. He can be somewhat indulgent and has a fiery temper. Although he might rush into a fight, he can still be reliable in an emergency. A wannabe bike cop, he is the only male sibling not in the Fire Department. Obsessed with drinking milk, in Gaoranger vs. Super Sentai, Daimon taught Kai Samezu/Gao Blue) how to perform his famous , which Kai eventually uses on Lost Highness Rakushaasa. He is 21 years old.
She is a  paramedic. A kind-hearted girl, she is a strong fighter who is very agile and quick. She is motivated by the sight of those weaker than herself in trouble, and she often loses her temper when the Psyma Family attack innocent people. At times, Matsuri is the one that brings order in the household when her brothers (and father) get out of line. She is 20 years old.

Allies
  is the scientist who created the suits, mecha and weapons for the GoGoFive team. Ten years before the events of the series, Mondo fails to convince everyone about his belief that the Psyma family will invade Earth despite his eminence. Forced into exile and ridiculed by the scientific community, he secretly develops the GoGoFive technology. At one time, he is a rival to his children's superior; the two try to outdo each other in everything from on-the-job assignments to women and sports. They even fight over who would be in charge of the Kyuukyuu Sentai, causing chaos within the team. In the end, Mondo wins the battle to govern the team. Mondo also builds an undersea base, which has various types of weapons and mecha for the team to use, known as Bay Area 55. To save the Earth and the human race he ends up paying the heavy price of losing his family. Years later, he has to convince his children to help him, in the face of their bitterness and anger towards a father who they thought died years before. His reappearance simply led his children to think that he abandoned their family. In the finale, Mondo flees with his rival when Bay Area 55 floods, and he now lives happily with his family. Mondo briefly comes out of retirement in Timeranger VS GoGo Five to prepare the GoGoFive equipment, when he detects Pierre's negative energy.
  is the wife of Professor Tatsumi, the mother of the GoGoFive, and the most important person-in-absence in their lives. Her words are portrayed as constantly running through the minds of her children, and keeping them going during their greatest trials and tribulations. When looking for their father, she boarded an aircraft which went on to disappear in the Philippines. She spent the next eight years in an island hospital in a coma. Her five children encountered her soul when they were trapped in the Yuuma Hell and she guided them out. When she finally regained consciousness, she remembered dreaming about her children fighting terrible monsters. She then contacted their house. Her children's friend, Kyouko Hayase, picked up the call and relayed the message to Daimon and Matsuri, after which they called her back. She appears briefly in episode 42, and is then at last returned to the family, alive and well in 49 and 50. At the end of the series Ritsuko is living with her family again.
  is a shuttle pilot who is Shou's friend. When the GoGoFive rescue her shuttle from a tornado caused by Tornadeus, she is able to recognize Shou's voice on the communications system because the GoGoFive are using the same radio frequency after Daimon accidentally refers to his older brother by name and Shou's usage of his family's motto. Afterwards she stated a desire to join the GoGoFive, but Mondo Tatsumi refused, as the team was always intended to comprise five people. Instead, she occasionally aids the GoGoFive in any way she can. In the finale, Kyouko played an important role; she confirmed that Grandiene was still alive (after the GoGoFive defeated her with the Max Victory Robo), after detecting her from her shuttle whilst in orbit, and then reporting it to the GoGoFive after she had returned to Earth. Later, when Mondo sent her to give the GoGoFive the information on where to find the Max Victory Robo Sigma Project, just after she barely escaped the destruction of Bay Area 55, Kyouko received a phone call from Ritsuko Tatsumi (who had just come out of her coma) and was able write down the call back number. Kyouko was able to pass both pieces of information on to Daimon and Matsuri which would be instrumental to the GoGoFive's final victory.
  is a cheery, childish analysis robot who controls the Five Liner at the Bay Area 55 base.
  is the head of the Capital Fire Dept. and Mondo Tatsumi's frenemy, who ended up being in charge of funding the GoGoFive project.
  was the last of a people who had fought and defeated the Juuma; his people were mostly exterminated by the sole surviving Juuma, Golmois. Being the only survivor, Zeek sought revenge and pursued Golmois to Earth where he encountered the GoGoFive, whom he blamed for saving the people in the crossfire instead of fighting Golmois. He came close to fighting them, but hesitated when he noticed that the wounded Kyouko resembled his superior officer . He healed her before he fought Go Red to a stalemate. When Kyouko arrives, Zeek leaves, as he reveals himself and his intent to kill Golmois before he gets the Dark Sword. As the GoGoFive fight off the Psyma, Zeek is mortally wounded. Go Red promises to stop Golmois as he leaves Zeek in Kyouko's care. Near death, and regaining his reason for fighting, Zeek gives Kyouko his gem which holds his Demon Hunter powers in it. He transformed with his jewel by shouting "Zeek Tector!".

Arsenal
 : The team's transformation device. They transform by opening the faceplate on the brace with the activation call  before pressing a button to activate it.
 : The suits that are formed when the GoGo Brace is activated.
 : A built-in scope that can see through objects.
 : A built-in scope that can scan enemy information.
The  can be detached and used with the most of the GoGoFive's weapons, as well as to operate the GoGoFive's mecha.
 : Colored ropes that all members possess.
 : A mechanical bird-themed multipurpose transforming tool that can be reorganized into , forming a cannon with a Laser Grip as the handle. The Life Bird can also be separated into weapons for the individual members which also require a Laser Grip:
 : Go Red's personal weapon.
 : Go Blue's personal weapon.
 : Go Green's personal weapon.
 : Go Yellow's personal weapon.
 : Go Pink's personal weapon.
 : A motorcycle, the  – equipped with lasers and a sidecar, equipped with drills, driven by Go Red.
 : Long lances that each member received in episode 18. It can be used to perform the  finisher.
 : A V-shaped boomerang that can be detached from the shaft of the V-Lancer.
 : A combination of the V-Lancer and the Five Laser's Laser Grip. The V-Machine Gun's team finisher is the Big V-Buster, where all five are used together to create a giant orb/V that destroys the Psyma Beast.
 : Received in episode 22. The V-Mode Brace is also used to activate the Max Victory Robo and Victory Mars combinations and can enhance the Go Blasters.
 : Guns that were created by Nagare in episode 29. When used in Hyper Mode, the V-Mode Brace is placed on top of the Go Blaster to amplify its power and the code "8-1-8, V" is entered. The team finisher is the  where all five Go Blasters in Hyper Mode are used together. The Go Blasters can also be used alongside the Five Laser for a double gun attack.

Rescue Mecha
These are mecha which come out of the  base and its .

99 Machines
The  are usually sortied at the command, "99 Machines, launch!".
  is Go Red's ladder truck, equipped with two extending  for rescuing people trapped in high places. The ladders are tipped with robotic hands which enable them to smash through any obstructions to reach trapped civilians, manipulate its environment, and even to hoist Red Ladder onto Victory Walker to form Victory Robo. For extra stability, Red Ladder can deploy support braces from its front and rear bumpers when using its ladders. It was rebuilt in Gaoranger vs. Super Sentai to help out. Forms the Victory Robo's body and arms.
  is Go Blue's chemical fire engine, equipped with four  extinguisher cannons. Forms Victory Walker's cockpit and Victory Robo's hips.
  is Go Green's aircraft whose rotating jet engines give it great maneuverability and VTOL (Vertical Take-Off and Landing) capabilities. It is equipped with the dual  and a ventral hatch which it uses to drop extinguisher bombs on fires as well as deploy magnetic  to air lift vehicles out of danger or aid the other 99 Machines in combining into Victory Walker and Victory Robo. Forms Victory Robo's head and back.
  is Go Yellow's giant armored vehicle. It possesses the  claw in its trunk which can be used to move debris and other obstructions. Forms the left leg of both Victory Walker and Victory Robo.
  is Go Pink's giant ambulance whose rear bay allows it to carry mass numbers of civilians to safely evacuate them from a battle or disaster scene. Forms the right leg of both Victory Walker and Victory Robo.

Victory Robo
 is the team's first giant robot, formed from the five 99 Machines via .

The Victory Walker is equipped with the Chemical Extinguishers.

After forming the Victory Walker they form the Victory Robo, in which the Red Ladder forms the chest and arms and the Green Hover forms the head and upper back. This robot is equipped with extendable arms used in an attack called Rapid Ladder Bomber, where the arms extend and deliver long-range punches. Another attack the Victory Robo can execute is the Ladder Wheel Crash.

Since Victory Robo or the other mechs could not be repaired in time for Timeranger VS GoGo Five, the team had to resort to bringing them back from the past for a short while to help the Timerangers in Time Robo. Despite having to be sent back to the past after that battle is over, Victory Robo would later rebuilt as shown by Red Ladder’s physical reappearance, and then Gao King receiving power from Victory Robo among other giant robots, in Gaoranger VS Super Sentai.

Grand Liner
The  is a group of five giant train cars that were designed to carry the 99 Machines into battle. After the Mars Machines were built, the Five Liner was loaded with the Mars Machines and hauled into space by the Max Shuttle in the  formation for the GoGoFive to use the Victory Mars. The Five Liner was also modified to form their own giant robo, via  which is approximately 1.4 times taller than the Victory Robo. Normally powered by both the Five Liner and the 99 Machines stored in the cars, it was revealed in episode 20 that without the 99 Machines, Grand Liner's operation time is limited to where it only has enough energy to fight for a short time.

 (which transports the Red Ladder or the Red Mars 1) forms the Grand Liner's right arm.  (which transports the Blue Thrower or the Blue Mars 2) forms the Grand Liner's left arm.  (which transports the Green Hover or the Green Mars 3) forms the Grand Liner's head, torso, and upper legs.  (which transports the Yellow Armor or the Yellow Mars 4) forms the Grand Liner's lower left leg.  (which transports the Pink Aider or the Pink Mars 5 and the Mars Cannon) forms the Grand Liner's lower right leg.

The robot has gatling weapons, as well as its  and  finishers (where the cannon weapons are transferred from the shoulders to the fists to provide additional power. The left shoulder cannon fires  missiles, and the right cannon fires  bullets) are the only weapons strong enough to pierce the hardened armor of the Golem Psyma Beasts.

In the finale, the Grand Liner had his right arm torn apart, thus rendering it useless in the battle against the Grandiene-possessed Zylpheeza and Salamandes. It is repaired, however, in time to be used again in events of Saber + Zenkaiger: Superhero Senki.

Liner Boy
The , modelled after a bullet train, was created by Mondo Tatsumi with some assistance from Kyouko. It had an A.I. unit, which allowed it to fight on autopilot. By the command , the  can haul the Five Liner that is loaded with the Mars Machines into space. When the command  is given after collecting enough solar energy from space, the Max Liner's front wheel assemblies become the arms, the rear section becomes the legs, the nose becomes the back (revealing the head), whilst the fender becomes the  weapon, and the solar-panelled side becomes the chest.

This robot could combine with the Victory Robo to form the Max Victory Robo. Although the Liner Boy's body was destroyed in the finale by the Grandiene-possessed Zylpheeza and Salamandes Dragon, the A.I. unit survived the destruction.

Max Victory Robo
Armaments provided from Liner Boy include jets stored within the feet that provide additional maneuverability, and the V-Max Cannons, which are two small wrist guns. Liner Boy forms Max Victory Robo's helmet, breastplate, pauldrons, gauntlets, fauld, and greaves.

Another ability the Max Victory Robo has is an array of solar panels, which enables it to absorb power from explosions. In its finisher, Max Nova, it unleashes its rail-gun style hip cannons and combines the firepower from all of the Max Victory Robo's guns.

In the finale, the Max Victory Robo was blown to pieces when Matoi moved it in the way of a blast shot by Zylpheeza and Salamandes to protect a flammable building, in which Daimon and Matsuri just escaped from while rescuing a group of children inside. Matoi barely survived the explosion.

Victory Mars

The Red Mars 1 forms the Beetle Mars' head and body, which becomes the Victory Mars' head and upper torso. The Blue Mars 2 forms the Beetle Mars' hind legs, which becomes the Victory Mars' arms. The Green Mars 3 forms the Beetle Mars' chest, which becomes Victory Mars' waist. The Yellow Mars 4 forms the Beetle Mars' left leg, which becomes the Victory Mars' own. Pink Mars 5 forms Beetle Mars' right leg, which becomes Victory Mars' own.

Unlike the other mecha, the Mars Machines have different technology that allows them to function without the aid of solar energy. Therefore it is the only mecha that is able to battle effectively when Salamandes creates the Psyma Zone.

It once used Victory Robo's Braver Sword for an attack called .

In the finale, the Victory Mars had its left arm torn apart, thus rendering it useless in the battle against the Grandiene-possessed Zylpheeza and Salamandes.

  is piloted by Go Red. It is armed with missiles.
  is piloted by Go Blue. It shoots hole-repairing adhesive bullets.
  is piloted by Go Green. It is the most maneuverable of the Mars Machines.
  is piloted by Go Yellow. It is heavily armored and equipped with manipulator claw.
  is piloted by Go Pink. It is equipped with manipulator claw and medical tools.

Max Victory Robo Black Version
 is Mondo Tatsumi's final robot, which resembles the Max Victory Robo but is colored black. This mecha is powered by the Tatsumi siblings' mental energy waves and has a sword that resembles the Victory Robo's Braver Sword, but its hilt has a red color rather than a blue color.

It is used in the final episode by the GoGoFive to stop the Grandiene-possessed Zylpheeza and Salamandes, after the original Max Victory Robo was destroyed, and both the Victory Mars and Grand Liner were rendered useless. GoGoFive used this robot with the knowledge that, although they had supposedly lost their father, their mother is still alive, and they used this mental energy to power up the sword which allowed them to emerge victorious over Grandiene.

In the course of its short appearance the Max Victory Robo Black Version is never disassembled into component mecha, though the toy incarnation could be devolved into six separate mecha.

Psyma Family
The  is a family of demons whose only objective is destruction and intends to use the Grand Cross planet alignment to bring great calamity to Earth. The Family's matriarch, the Grand Witch Grandiene, hoped to travel to the real world by using the great amounts of "negative energy" that would emerge on Earth when the Grand Cross had formed. Her children, the Psyma Four Siblings, awaited her arrival, sending  to destroy and finish off human civilization.

  is the leader of the Psyma Family and mother to the five siblings, an embodiment of the universe's negative energy. Though Grandiene had set everything up for her arrival in this reality on the day of the Grand Cross in 1999, she only partially manifested as the result of the GoGoFive interrupting the ritual and uses her remaining children to gather enough negative energy for her to complete their transition. After Salamandes's death, Grandiene takes matters into her own hands and uses the evil energies gathered by the Psyma Paradico to complete her passing. Grandiene then sends Cobolda to his death to accomplish her goals, revealing to Zylpheeza that she never really cared for the well-being of her children as her experience with Gill convinced her that they would also turn on her and that they served their purpose in helping her enter the human world. Her body was destroyed by the Max Victory Robo, though her spirit remained and takes possession of the revived and powered up bodies of Zylpheeza and Salamandes. Grandeine is finally destroyed when she is stripped of all power when the Max Victory Robo B-Version defeats Zylpheeza and Salamandes, her bodiless spirit exploding in the upper atmosphere.
  is the true first-born son of the Psyma Family. Surviving the ordeal, Gill became stronger and ruled over the dead up to the present. He plans to do this by using the blood of many people to accomplish this goal. He is fatally wounded fighting Go Red and Ginga Red, but he uses his own blood to complete the ritual before he explodes.
  is the eldest son of the Psyma Family and the demon of Aerial Calamity and Psyma Commander. Actually, the second born son of the Family, Zylpheeza is given the highest title of Dark King and resents humans, but is deeply loving to his siblings and mother. He is admired by Cobolda and Denus. Eventually, Zylpheeza goes to war with them but is first to be destroyed by the Max Victory Robo. After a few attempts, Zylpheeza is resurrected, at the cost of Denus' life. He soon learns the truth about his mother after killing his younger brother Cobolda under her influence. He is then killed by his mother in an effort to destroy the GoGoFive. He is later revived as a puppet, with parts of him turned black, including his eyes. After hearing the words of Nagare and Shou, Zylpheeza awakens, just to be killed again by his youngest brother Salamandes. Zylpheeza is possessed by Grandiene's spirit and transformed into the giant . Along with Salamandes, the two are able to destroy the Max Victory Robo (piloted by Go Red), and disable the Grand Liner (piloted by Go Blue) and the Victory Mars (piloted by Go Green), but both are eventually killed by the Max Victory Robo Black Version.
  is the second son of the Psyma Family, actually Grandiene's third born son, the Demon of Ground Calamity. He is the strongest of the Psyma Four Siblings and his strategies always rely more in power than thought, giving him a complex when he compares himself with the dexterous warrior Zylpheeza or the cunning strategist Denus. Secretly coveting the rank of Dark King, he tries to take it over after Zylpheeza's death, but is overpowered by Salamandes. He and his older brother Zylpheeza are close because they survived together when they were younger; ironically, near the finale, his mother tricked him to fight the GoGoFive when he is given a new, powerful cannon, and is killed by Zylpheeza who was being controlled by Grandiene.
  is Grandiene's only daughter and only human-resembling child, the Demon of Aquatic Calamity. Gifted in the arts of disguise, she often uses them to gather information or to cause havoc. Her strategies are particularly cruel and fearsome. She feels great respect for her older brother Zylpheeza. Eventually, her plan to use a pair of Psyma Beast Parasites to siphon off Matoi's life-force to resurrect Zylpheeza fails, when the other GoGoFive are able to separate the male parasite from Matoi, by striking the female parasite on Zylpheeza's chest. Denus, not wanting Zylpheeza to die again, summons the male parasite onto her own chest and sacrifices her life so Zylpheeza could live.
  is the youngest, formerly the third son  at the start of the series, the dragon-like Demon of Fire Calamity whose blood possesses regenerative properties. During the first half of the series, Drop was mainly cared for by Pierre with his sorcery and pyrokinesis allowing him to participate with his older siblings despite being a baby. Drop inherits Zylpheeza's Dark King Star upon his death, using its energy to enter a chrysalis state while his soul briefly split off in the form of a pyrokinetic human boy Matsuri befriended before returning to his body once it has fully matured. As , using the Dark King Star on his chest to create a sunless  which increases a Psyma Beast's power tenfold, he abuses his position as leader while bossing Cobolda and Denus around. But Salamandes soon begins to lose Grandiene's favor after the GoGoFive use Victory Mars to stop the negative energy asteroid that she sent, worsen after losing the Infinity Card when it was destroyed. But Pierre directs Salamandes into eating all the hellbound demons to escape the Yuuma Hell, with Salamandes bent on disposing of Grandiene while now about to use human souls into energy through a  that Pierre created at an orphanage. When the long-lost mother of one of the orphaned children that the GoGoFive had befriended arrived, her tears weakened the Psyma Tree's power. Without the soul energy,  is destroyed by Victory Mars and Max Victory Robo with only the Dark King Star remaining. In the finale, Pierre manages to convince Grandiene to resurrect Salamandes, who is given command over a revived Zylpheeza. Shou and Nagare were able to convince Zylpheeza that Salamandes is his younger brother Drop, forcing Salamandes to kill him before being defeated when Shou and Nagare counterattacked with their Hyper Mode Go Blasters. Grandiene revives Salamandes as a puppet under her control in the dragon-like . With Zylpheeza II, the two demons destroy the Max Victory Robo, and disable the Grand Liner and the Victory Mars, but both are killed by the Max Victory Robo Black Version.
  is the family servant and a fly-themed sorcerer who dominates the Psyma Cards, being able to create and resurrect the defeated Psyma Beasts. Pierre acts as a nanny to the young Drop and is most loyal to him among the siblings. Despite appearing to have been killed when hit by the backlash energy from the Max Victory Robo Sigma Project's sword, it actually turned him into a small fly-like form. Pierre resurfaced in Timeranger VS GoGo Five, and merges with the criminal Boribaru, only to killed by Time Robo and Victory Robo’s combined strength while Boribaru is contained without being killed as well.
The Juuma Hunters forced most of his tribe into extinction, with only Golmois to remain as he slaughtered all but Zeek, losing his Dark Sword in the process. Golmois arrived on Earth where the Dark Sword landed, forming an alliance with the Psyma Family so he can use them to hold Zeek long enough to reclaim his Dark Sword and assume his true dragon-like giant form. It took the combined force of the Juuma Hunter power and Victory Robo to finally destroy him for good.
 The  are foot soldiers, armed with short swords. The Imps could become mecha-sized when in the Psyma Zone.
 The  are a group of female Imps who serve Denus, with one destroyed by Denus and the other two destroyed by GoGoFive. Pierre revives them as one giant Imp that then divides to become three clones. These clones are destroyed by Max Victory Robo.

Episodes (Missions)

Direct-to-video releases
 (1999): This movie occurs between missions 18 and 19 due to the inclusion of Zylpheeza (who the team met in 18) and Drop being awake (Drop suddenly goes to sleep in 19).
 (1999)
 (2000): This movie occurs between missions 31 and 32 because of the use of Victory Mars (full use in 31) and Salamandes being alive and supported by Grandiene (Salamandes changes in 42).
 (2001)

Cast
Matoi Tatsumi: 
Nagare Tatsumi: 
Shou Tatsumi: 
Daimon Tatsumi: 
Matsuri Tatsumi:  (Played as )
Mondo Tatsumi: 
Kyouko Hayase: 
Ritsuko Tatsumi: 
Kenji Inui: 
Denus:

Voice actors
Mint: 
Liner Boy: 
Grandiene: 
Zylpheeza: 
Cobolda: 
Drop: Yūko Miyamura (Played as )
Salamandes: 
Pierre: 
Narration:

Direct-to-video guest cast
Zeek: 
Golmois (Voice): 
Gill (Voice):

Songs
Opening theme

Lyrics: 
Composition & Arrangement: 
Artist: 

Ending theme

Lyrics: 
Composition: 
Arrangement: 
Artist:

International Broadcasts and Home Video
International releases were very limited to a few regions, because most of them around the world would receive foreign language dubs of the Power Rangers adaptation, which is Power Rangers Lightspeed Rescue.
In Thailand, the series originally did not air on TV in favor of the Power Rangers series. But however, it was released on home video with a Thai dub on VCD originally in the early 2000s, with Rose Media Entertainment being the distributor (formerly Rose Video). It later was sold on DVD by simply combining the VCD files onto the DVD release. Despite not airing on open broadcast TV, it did air on the Gang Cartoon Channel satellite television channel. 49 out of 50 episodes were dubbed and aired, but episode 44 was not dubbed.
In North America, the series would receive a DVD release by Shout! Factory on April 24, 2018 in the original Japanese audio with English subtitles. It is the eighth Super Sentai series to be officially released in the region.
In the Phillippines, the series aired on RBN from January 5, 2019, until December 14, 2019.

Notes

References

 Book references

External links
  
 Official Shout! Factory page
 Official Shout! Factory Tv page

..

Super Sentai
1999 Japanese television series debuts
2000 Japanese television series endings
TV Asahi original programming
Japanese action television series
Japanese fantasy television series
Japanese science fiction television series
1990s Japanese television series
2000s Japanese television series
Television series set in 1999
Television series about families
Television series about siblings